The Mega Cavern is a former limestone mine in Louisville, Kentucky. The cave stretches under parts of the Watterson Expressway and the Louisville Zoo. Due to its support structures, it is classified as a building and is the largest building in Kentucky. The cavern is used for business, storage, recycling, and tourism, with offerings including tram-guided tours, zipline tours, a ropes course, an annual holiday lights display, and, previously, a mountain bike park

Description 
The Mega Cavern is a  structure located in Louisville, Kentucky. About  underground, the cave stretches under parts of the Watterson Expressway and the Louisville Zoo. Due to its support structures, it is classified as a building and is the largest building in Kentucky.

History and use

Limestone mine 

The cavern started as Louisville Crushed Stone. It was created by a massive limestone quarry—with miners blasting out rock for over 42 years during the middle of the 20th century. It was acquired in 1989 by private investors who saw the potential to develop a portion of the cavern into an environmentally-conscious high security commercial storage facility.

Renovation

Business park 
Exhausted of its mineable limestone, the property was purchased by Jim Lowry, Tom Tyler and Don Tyler in 1989 to be made into a "high-security business park".

Storage 
To be useful, the floor was raised by filling in parts of the mine with recycled materials. A fire-resistant safety corridor was also installed as an emergency exit. Various rooms are located throughout the cavern to store various items from road salt and vehicles to pretzels and amusement park rides.

Tourism 
In 2009, the Mega Cavern began offering a Jeep-drawn tour of the area where the floor had been raised. Around Christmas, the cavern hosts "Lights Under Louisville" where visitors can drive through the cavern and view lighted holiday decorations; it is the largest such underground display in the world. Several years later, a zipline tour and a ropes course were added to the offerings.

With national and international attention, an underground mountain bike park was opened to riders of all skill levels in February 2015. It was designed by Joe Prisel with families in mind, and constructed in over 3 months. The  of trails (over   interconnected) include "jump lines, pump tracks, dual slalom, BMX, cross country, and singletrack" and signs to indicate the difficulty of the trails. Bike rentals were planned to be offered in the near future. Partially due to the Mega Cavern's recycling business that filled the cave, trails were built with in layers with a rough bottom, sticky, red clay middle, and "good stuff" on top. The bike park is permanently closed.

See also 
 List of attractions and events in the Louisville metropolitan area
 SubTropolis, a similar but much larger cavern in Kansas City, Missouri

References

External links 
 

Sports venues in Louisville, Kentucky
Caves of Kentucky
Limestone caves
Bike paths in Kentucky
Quarries in the United States
Former mines in the United States
Tourist attractions in Louisville, Kentucky
Landforms of Louisville, Kentucky